Mohammad Modabber (1890–1966) was an Iranian painter, who was one of the developers of "coffee shop painting".

References

1967 deaths
Iranian painters
1890 births
20th-century Iranian people